was a Japanese columnist, photographer, and pundit. After failing the entrance exams for the University of Tokyo and the University of Tsukuba, Katsuya entered Waseda University in 1980. He started working for an editor of Bungeishunjū after graduating from the University in 1985.

On July 2, 2017, he was a candidate in the 2017 Hyōgo gubernatorial election, but was defeated by incumbent Toshizō Ido who won his fifth term.

Death 
He died of alcoholic hepatitis on November 28, 2018.

References

External links 
 Official website 

1960 births
2018 deaths
Japanese anti-communists
Japanese columnists
Japanese editors
Japanese journalists
Japanese political candidates
Japanese political commentators
People from Amagasaki
Waseda University alumni
Deaths from hepatitis
Alcohol-related deaths in Japan